Vasilios Konstantinou (born 13 September 1992) is a Cypriot athlete specialising in the high jump. He has won several Games of the Small States of Europe titles.

His personal bests in the event are 2.28 metres outdoors (Kavala 2017) and 2.28 metres indoors (Hustopece 2016).

International competitions

References

1992 births
Living people
Sportspeople from Geneva
Cypriot male high jumpers
Athletes (track and field) at the 2014 Commonwealth Games
Athletes (track and field) at the 2018 Commonwealth Games
Commonwealth Games competitors for Cyprus
Athletes (track and field) at the 2018 Mediterranean Games
Mediterranean Games competitors for Cyprus